Samuel Knight may refer to:

 Samuel Knight (architect) (1834–1911), English architect
 Samuel Knight (bishop) (1868–1932), Bishop of Jarrow, 1924–1932
 Samuel Knight (judge) (1731–1804), Vermont Supreme Court Justice
 Samuel Knight (priest) (1675–1746), English priest and antiquary
 Samuel Howell Knight (1892–1975), American geologist

See also
Sammy Knight (born 1975), former professional American football player
Sam Norton-Knight